Studentafton is Scandinavia's leading politically and religiously independent forum for speech and debate and is a part of the Academic Society at Lund University. The Academic Society is a non-profit organization of students and teachers at Lund University. The Academic Society, established in 1830, hosts many cultural and social activities in Lund. These include lectures, theatrical performances, public debates and musical entertainment.

Studentafton (lit. "student evening") features politicians, authors, Nobel laureate, musicians, scientists and other persons of interest to the student body in Lund. The organization's main task is to honor freedom of speech. A Studentafton can take various forms. Debates, concerts and talks are all common.

Past speakers 

Notable speakers and guests include: Dag Hammarskjöld, Jimi Hendrix, Louis Armstrong, Ingmar Bergman, Susan Sontag, Willy Brandt, Miriam Makeba, Diana Ross, Duke Ellington, Pierre Balmain, Tage Erlander, Ray Charles, Ella Fitzgerald, Leni Riefenstahl, Bobby Seale, Muddy Waters, Depeche Mode, Georg Henrik von Wright, Olof Palme, Pink Floyd, Pink Floyd, Frank Zappa, Anna Lindh, Martti Ahtisaari, Carl Bildt, Günter Wallraff, George Martin, Hans Blix, Barbara Hendricks, Albert Schweitzer, Göran Persson, Lukas Moodysson, Depeche Mode, Stig Bergling, Cicciolina, Anton Corbijn, F W de Klerk, Shazia Mirza, Íngrid Betancourt, Christer Fuglesang, P D James, Bianca Jagger, Fredrik Reinfeldt, Tarja Halonen, Queen Silvia, Queen Margrethe II of Denmark,.

References

External links 
 studentafton.se

Student organizations established in 1905
1905 establishments in Sweden